"Summertime Blues" is a song co-written and recorded by American rock artist Eddie Cochran.  It was written by Cochran and his manager Jerry Capehart. Originally a single B-side, it was released in August 1958 and peaked at number 8 on the Billboard Hot 100 on September 29, 1958, and number 18 on the UK Singles Chart. It has been covered by many artists, including being a number-one hit for country music artist Alan Jackson, and scoring notable hits in versions by Blue Cheer, The Who, and Brian Setzer, the last of whom recorded his version for the 1987 film La Bamba, in which he portrayed Cochran. Jimi Hendrix performed it in concert. T. Rex recorded their own rendition of the song for their self-titled debut album T. Rex in 1970 and performed it live.

Lyrics
The song is about the struggle between a teenager and his parents, his boss and his congressman during the summer. The narrator resents having to take a job in order to earn pocket money, and he cannot go on a date with his girlfriend because his boss keeps scheduling him to work late. After falsely telling the boss he is sick in order to get out of going to work, his parents will not let him use their car due to his laziness. Finally, he considers visiting the United Nations to complain about his situation; he settles for writing to his congressman, who brushes him off since he is too young to vote.

Eddie Cochran version
"Summertime Blues" was recorded on March 28, 1958, at Gold Star Recording Studios in Hollywood, California. Eddie Cochran sang both the vocal and bass vocal (the "work-a-late" portions, Cochran's tribute to the Kingfish character from the Amos and Andy television series), played all the guitar parts, and added the hand clapping with possibly Sharon Sheeley. Connie 'Guybo' Smith played the electric bass and Earl Palmer drums.

Legacy
The 1958 Liberty Records single by Eddie Cochran was inducted into the Grammy Hall of Fame in 1999 and the song is ranked number 73 in Rolling Stone's 500 Greatest Songs of All Time. In March 2005, Q magazine placed it at number 77 in its list of the 100 Greatest Guitar Tracks. The song is also on the Rock and Roll Hall of Fame and Museum list of "The Songs That Shaped Rock and Roll". The song appears in the movies Caddyshack, This Boy's Life and American Shaolin, as well as season 4 of Beverly Hills, 90210.

Chart performance

Johnny Chester version
Australian rock 'n' roll singer Johnny Chester cited Cochran as one of his idols and had used the track when rehearsing his first band in 1959. Chester released his cover version on W&G Records in 1962 and was backed on the recording by local instrumental group The Chessmen, with Bert Stacpool on piano, his brother Les Stacpool on guitar, Frank McMahon on bass guitar, and Graeme Trottman on drums. In December it peaked at No. 30 on the Kent Music Report.

Hep Stars version 
Swedish rock band Hep Stars recorded Summertime Blues as a single in late December 1964. It was a six-hour, consecutive session in which the Hep Stars recorded six tracks: "Summertime Blues", "A Tribute to Buddy Holly", "Farmer John", "If You Need Me", "Bird Dog" and "Donna". The sessions for these were the first professional recordings of keyboardist Benny Andersson, later of ABBA fame. Their manager, Åke Gerhard had booked the recording sessions, as cheaply as he possibly could get away with. He booked Borgarskolan in central Stockholm and quickly turned it into a makeshift recording studio. Andersson would later comment on the sessions:

Of these tracks, only "A Tribute to Buddy Holly" was released as a single in February 1965. While that initially failed to chart, their increasing popularity was fueled by their March 23, 1965 appearance on Drop-In which quickly made "A Tribute to Buddy Holly" climb the charts. This prompted Gerhard and his record label Olga Records to quickly issue "Summertime Blues" "Farmer John" and "Cadillac" as singles in late March 1965. While "Farmer John", "Cadillac" and "A Tribute to Buddy Holly" peaked at number 1, 2 and 4 at the same time on Tio i Topp, "Summertime Blues" missed the charts altogether. This was most likely due to the fact that guitarist Janne Frisk provided lead vocals on the track, as opposed to Svenne Hedlund singing it. "Summertime Blues" and "A Tribute to Buddy Holly" became the Hep Stars only singles to feature Frisk on lead vocals.

While not issued on any album at the time, it, along with the B-Side were issued as bonus material on the 1996 remaster of their debut album We and Our Cadillac

Personnel 

 Janne Frisk – guitar, lead vocals
 Christer Pettersson – drums
 Benny Andersson – keyboards, piano
 Lennart Hegland – bass guitar

Blue Cheer version

The American rock band Blue Cheer recorded their version of "Summertime Blues" in 1967 and included it on their 1968 release entitled Vincebus Eruptum. The single peaked at #14 on the Billboard Hot 100, pushing the sales of the album even higher to #11. It topped the Dutch charts for one week in 1968. While not as widely played or recognized as The Who's version, it certainly is more distorted. This version was ranked #73 on the list of "The 100 Greatest Guitar Songs of All Time" of Rolling Stone. This version omits the responses and instead has each band member do a quick "solo". A portion of Blue Cheer's version appears in the movie Troll.  Rush did a cover of this version for their Feedback EP. The main riff from Jimi Hendrix's "Foxy Lady" has been inserted in various parts of this version.

Chart performance

The Who version

The Who played "Summertime Blues" as a staple of their concerts from their early days up to 1976, with intermittent appearances thereafter. It has not been played since the death of bassist John Entwistle in 2002. It was performed during the 1967 US tour, from which the first known Who recordings of the song were made, including a June 1967 date at the Monterey Pop Festival.

The first version to be released by The Who appeared on the 1970 album Live at Leeds. The single from this album peaked at number 38 in the UK and number 27 in the US. "I'm a big fan of 'Summertime Blues' on that album," remarked Rush bassist Geddy Lee, "which we covered [see below] to a large degree because of their version."

This version by The Who differed from the original in both the sense of aggression and volume. As lead singer Roger Daltrey noted, "We'd taken the song from being in kind of a swing rhythm on the off-beat to a rock rhythm on the one." Entwistle would sing the bass parts on the song, but the band struggled to capture the same energy of it in the studio. The live version recorded at the Leeds show managed to capture this fully.

Studio version

The Who recorded at least two studio versions of this track in 1967. They went unreleased until 1998 and 2009, when they appeared on the remastered CD of Odds & Sods and the deluxe edition of The Who Sell Out, respectively. Other live versions from the Who are featured in the Monterey Pop Festival CD box set and the concert and documentary film Woodstock (1970), as well as Live at the Isle of Wight Festival 1970 and the CD release of Live at the Royal Albert Hall.

Critical reception

Billboard magazine reviewed the song favorably, saying that The Who gave it a "wild updating" and was "certain to put them right up there at the top."

Chart performance

T. Rex version
T. Rex recorded the song in 1970, using it as a standalone B-side to their breakthrough "Ride a White Swan" single. Further, "Summertime Blues" was frequently performed at T. Rex concerts from 1970 to 1972.  Unlike the acoustic studio version, live performances of the song were always with electric guitars, as was the December 1970 version recorded for BBC Radio 1.

Mick Farren version
Mick Farren, former lead singer of The Deviants recorded the song in December 1969, releasing it on his 1970 solo album Mona – The Carnivorous Circus

Alan Jackson version

American country music artist Alan Jackson recorded the song for his 1994 album, Who I Am. It was released in June 1994 as the lead single from the album and the song reached Number One on the U.S. Billboard Hot Country Singles & Tracks chart and number 4 on the Bubbling Under Hot 100 (equivalent to number 104 on the Billboard Hot 100). Jackson said that he was inspired by Buck Owens' version.

Critical reception

Deborah Evans Price of Billboard magazine reviewed the song favorably, saying that Jackson "gives the oft-covered Eddie Cochran oldie the full, twangy 'Chattahoochee' treatment." She goes on to say that "until the vocal starts, you may not know which song you're listening to. But who cares?" She says that with his "signature laid-back vocal style, the long, tall Georgian turns this '50s teen anthem into a '90s country classic." Kevin John Coyne of Country Universe reviewed the song unfavorably, saying that Jackson blatantly attempted to recreate the "Chattahoochee" phenomenon. He goes on to say that the "charm of the Eddie Cochran original is lost by forcing those country line-dance beats into the backing track."

Music video

The video was directed by Michael Salomon and was released in June 1994. Considered by Jackson as the "sequel" to his "Chattahoochee" video a year earlier, it was also the only video of his that Salomon directed. It begins with a shot of him water-skiing (which ends the "Chattahoochee" video) before transitioning to him and a band performing the song while seated in the bed of a pickup. Many 4-wheelers, ATVs and a limo full of middle-aged farmers are seen riding through the mud and getting stuck. Jackson, in a plain white t-shirt, is seen riding around in the mud in his pickup before getting out and walking in between many people fighting in the mud. However, he stays stainless until the very end, where he only gets one small spot of mud on the left side of his shirt before finally joining in the tussle. It ends with Jackson posing as a scarecrow.

Chart positions

"Summertime Blues" debuted at number 53 on the US Billboard Hot Country Singles & Tracks for the week of June 18, 1994.

Year-end charts

Johnny Hallyday version

The song was covered in French by Johnny Hallyday. His version (titled "La Fille de l'été dernier") was released in 1975 and spent one week at no. 1 on the singles sales chart in France (from May 10 to 16, 1975).

Charts

Rush version

Canadian rock band Rush released their cover as a single on May 21, 2004. It was later included on their cover EP Feedback, released on June 29. The song was performed live during the band's 30th anniversary tour later that year, and was included on the R30: 30th Anniversary World Tour concert DVD. The fourth line of each verse is omitted.

Their version of "Summertime Blues" was also used as an official theme song for WWE's  SummerSlam PPV event in 2004.

Chart positions

Personnel
 Geddy Lee – lead vocals, bass
 Alex Lifeson – guitar
 Neil Peart – drums, percussion

Other cover versions
The Beach Boys covered the song on their album, Surfin' Safari.
Hush covered the song on their album, Aloud 'n' Live.
Olivia Newton-John covered the song in 1975 for her album Clearly Love.
The Rolling Stones recorded a version during the 1978 Woodstock rehearsals.
The Flying Lizards released an avant-garde cover of the song as their first single in 1978. Their version peaked at number 75 in Australia.
Bruce Springsteen and the E Street Band performed the song in concert.
Van Halen performed the song live on their 1978 US/European tour and the 1983 South American leg of the Diver Down Tour.
Debbie Harry covered the song in 1992 for That Night soundtrack
The Little River Band performed a live version which appeared on the 1992 album Live Classics.
Cheech Marin in the movie Born In East L.A. as well as in Up in Smoke. 
Alvin and the Chipmunks covered the song for "Island Fever", a 1987 episode of their TV series. 
It appears in electronic form in the Creature from the Black Lagoon pinball machine, but does not appear in the Pinball Arcade version due to rights issues.
Bon Jovi recorded a demo tape of the song in 1983.
Brian Setzer recorded a cover of the song for the 1987 film La Bamba, in which he played Cochran himself.
The Black Keys recorded the song as a B-side to their Rubber Factory single "10 A.M. Automatic".
Test parodied in Occitan this song in 1993 on their album Sea, sex and sòm
 Slovenian band The Drinkers parodied this song in 1997 on their album Žeja
 Mike Love of the Beach Boys covered the song on his 2019 solo album, 12 Sides of Summer.
  
The Prophets, Levon Helm, Guitar Wolf, The Flying Lizards, Bobby Vee, The Crickets, Buck Owens, James Taylor, Joan Jett and The Blackhearts, Jimmy Buffett, The Ventures, Dick Dale, Robert Gordon with Link Wray, Skid Row, T. Rex, MC5, Alex Chilton, Marty Wilde, and The Chuck Fenech Band have also covered the song.

References

Songs about teenagers
Songs about parenthood
1958 singles
1968 singles
1970 singles
1994 singles
2004 singles
Eddie Cochran songs
The Beach Boys songs
Blue Cheer songs
Rush (band) songs
The Who songs
Alan Jackson songs
Johnny Hallyday songs
The Flying Lizards songs
Songs written by Eddie Cochran
Songs written by Jerry Capehart
Song recordings produced by Keith Stegall
Liberty Records singles
Arista Nashville singles
Philips Records singles
Track Records singles
Decca Records singles
Atlantic Records singles
Anthem Records singles
Music videos directed by Michael Salomon
1958 songs
Hep Stars songs
1965 singles
The Crickets songs